Rodriguezia lanceolata is a species of orchid found from the St. Vincent, Trinidad, Panama, Colombia, Venezuela, the Guianas, Suriname, Peru, Ecuador, and Brazil.

References

External links
IOSPE orchid photos, Rodriguezia lanceolata Ruiz & Pavon 1798 Photo courtesy of Jay Pfahl
Santa Barbara Orchid Estate
Seattle Orchid

lanceolata
Orchids of South America
Orchids of Panama
Flora of Trinidad and Tobago
Flora of the Windward Islands
Plants described in 1798
Flora without expected TNC conservation status